The following is a list of women climate scientists and activists by nationality – women who are well known for their work in the field of climatology.

Introduction
Women have made major contributions to climate change research and policy and to broader analysis of global environmental issues.  They include many women scientists as well as policy makers and activists. Women researchers have made significant contributions to major scientific assessments such as those of the Millennium Ecosystem Assessment and are reasonably well represented on key global change committees of the International Council for Science (ICSU) and US National Academy of Sciences.  They have played important leadership roles in international climate policy. For example, Christiana Figueres leads the international climate negotiations as the Executive Secretary of the UN Framework Convention on Climate Change (UNFCCC) and former Irish President Mary Robinson is the UN Special Envoy on Climate Change.
Susan Solomon chaired the climate science working group 1 of the Intergovernmental Panel on Climate Change Fourth Assessment in 2007. Since 1990, women have been playing an increasingly important role on the Intergovernmental Panel on Climate Change, a key international forum.

Afghanistan
Zuhal Atmar, pioneering environmentalist who ran a recycling plant
Faiza Darkhani (born 1992), environmentalist, climate change scholar, and women's rights activist

Argentina
Inés Camilloni (born 1964), climatologist studying climate change in South America

Australia
Nerilie Abram (born 1977), researcher in climate change and paleoclimatology
Tracy Ainsworth, marine biologist working on coral reefs
Lisa Alexander, international expert on heatwaves
Julie Arblaster, climate change researcher, contributor to Intergovernmental Panel on Climate Change
Sue Barrell, meteorologist active in climate monitoring and ocean-earth observations
Kirsten Benkendorff (born 1973), marine scientist working on molluscs
Wendy Bowman (born c.1934), environmental activist
Wendy Craik (born 1949), scientist working for the Climate Change Authority
Adriana Dutkiewicz, sedimentologist at the University of Sydney
Ann Henderson-Sellers (1952-),  climate change risk evaluation
Taryn Lane, renewable energy expert
Judith Lean, Australian-American solar and climate scientist
India Logan-Riley, Māori climate activist
Janice Lough, climate scientist researching coral reefs
Amanda Lynch, Professor at Brown University researching atmospheric and climate change science, and environmental policy and Indigenous knowledge
Cara Augustenborg (1938–2017), Slovene-American artist and environmental activist
Ann Henderson-Sellers (born 1952), earth systems scientist focusing on climatic impacts
Jane McAdam (born 1974), legal expert on climate change and refugees
Helen McGregor, geologist and climate change researcher, Research School of Earth Sciences at the Australian National University
Amanda McKenzie, commentator on climate change
Jessica Melbourne-Thomas, marine ecologist and ecosystem modeller
Sam Mostyn (born c.1964), businesswoman active in climate change
Sarah Perkins-Kirkpatrick (born 1983), heatwave research
Anjali Sharma (born 2004), child climate activist
Kate Trinajstic, paleontologist and evolutionary biologist
Jo Vallentine (born 1946), anti-nuclear activist
Carden Wallace, marine biologist and museum director, expert on corals
Shemara Wikramanayake (born 1962), businesswoman striving for low carbon emissions and renewable energy production
Penny Whetton (1958–2019), regional climate change projections for Australia
Katherine Woodthorpe, executive involved in bushfire and natural hazards

Belgium
Margaretha Guidone (born c.1956), activist campaigning against global warming

Bolivia
Ximena Vélez Liendo (born 1976), biologist focusing on the ecology of the Andean bear

Brazil
Rosaly Lopes (born 1957), geologist specializing in volcanology
Antônia Melo (born 1949), environmentalist and human rights activist

Cameroon
Sevidzem Ernestine Leikeki (born 1985), climate activist

Canada
Eriel Deranger (born 1979), indigenous rights activist intent on climate action
Marie-Josée Fortin (born 1958), spatial ecology researcher
Natalya Gomez, climate-ice sheet-solid earth modeler, professor at McGill University
Katharine Hayhoe (born 1972), atmospheric science, global climate models
Nasrin Husseini, Afghan-born refugee, food activist working on improved productivity through breeding
Naomi Klein (born 1970), author, filmmaker and environmental activist
Melina Laboucan-Massimo, climate justice and Indigenous rights activist
Corinne Le Quéré (born 1966), Royal Society research professor, University of East Anglia
Deborah Martin-Downs, aquatic biologist, ecologist
Line Rochefort, ecologist specializing in peatland restoration
Marie Sanderson (1921–2010), geographer and climatologist

Chad
Hindou Oumarou Ibrahim, environmental activist and geographer

Chile
Adriana Hoffmann (1940–2022), environmentalist involved in the sustainable management of Chilean forests
Sara Larraín (born 1962), politician and environmental activist
Veronica Vallejos (born c. 1967), marine biologist and Antarctic researcher

China
Chai Jing (born 1976), journalist and environmental activist producing a documentary, later banned, on pollution and environmental policy
Howey Ou (born c.2003), young activist inspired by Greta Thunberg

Colombia
Xiomara Acevedo, climate change activist coordinating government policy
Paola Arias, climate change researcher
Martha Peralta Epieyú, politician and lawyer specializing in environmental law
Aída Quilcué (fl 1990s), environmentalist and politician
Diana Marcela Bolaños Rodriguez (born 1981), marine biologist studying flat worms and stem cell regeneration

Costa Rica
Christiana Figueres (born 1956), diplomat specializing in international climate change negotiations

Denmark

Inger Andersen (born 1958), economist and environmentalist working with international organizations
Lone Drøscher Nielsen (born 1984), wildlife conservationist active in Borneo
Inge Lehmann (1888–1993), seismologist and geophysicist
Signe Normand, biologist researching vegetation in the Artic tundra

Dominican Republic
Idelisa Bonnelly (1931–2022), marine biologist who created first sanctuary in the North Atlantic for humpback whales

Ecuador
Anita Rivas (born 1972), lawyer and conservationish

Fiji
Kavita Naidu, lawyer working on international climate change law

Finland
Hanna Kokko (born 1971), evolutionary ecologist

France
Hélène Bergès (born 1966), director of the Plant Genomic Resources Center (CNRGV), plant geneticist investigating ocean-atmospheric coupling
Pascale Braconnot, climate scientist
Valérie Cabanes (born 1969), lawyer and environmentalist
Anny Cazenave (born 1944), geodesist researching sea level rise caused by global warming
Françoise Gasse (1942–2014), paleobiologist specializing in lacustrine sediments
Amaelle Landais-Israël (born 1977), climatologist researching Greenland ice and the North Atlantic
Marguerite Augusta Marie Löwenhielm, mycologist studying the effectiveness of American grapevine against harmful insect pest
Valerie Masson-Delmotte, focus on paleoclimatology at the Climate and Environment Sciences Laboratory (LSCE)
Anaïs Orsi, climate scientist studying global warming through changes in polar ice
Magali Reghezza-Zitt, geographer and co-director of the Centre de formation sur l'environnement et la société at the École normale supérieure. Her work focuses on the notions of risk and crisis, vulnerability and resilience, and adaptation, in the context of globalisation and environmental change. She is a menmber High Council on Climate and Chevalier Ordre national du Mérite.
Catherine Ritz, Antarctic researcher working on ice sheets and rise in sea level
Françoise Vimeux, climatologist, research director at the Institut de recherche pour le développement (IRD), works at the Laboratoire des sciences du climat et de l'environnement (LSCE) and the Laboratoire HydroSciences Montpellier (HSM)

Germany
Silvia Bender (born 1970), Green party politician
Nancy Bertler, Antarctic researcher investigating climate history
Lina Eichler (born 2002), climate activist
Sabine Fuss, climate scientist focusing on sustainable resource management
Ulrike Lohmann (born 1966), climate researcher focusing on aerosol particles in clouds
Katrin Meissner, German and Australian physical oceanographer and climate scientist, director of the Climate Change Research Centre at University of New South Wales
Friederike Otto (born 1982), German climatologist, associate director of the Environmental Change Institute
Ricarda Winkelmann (born 1985), climatologist researching interdependencies between climate, land ice and the ocean
Kirsten Zickfeld, climate physicist now based in Canada

Ghana
Nana Klutse (born 1981), climate scientist

Guatemala
Nicole Hernandez Hammer, Guatemalan-American climate scientist studying sea level rise

Guinea-Bissau
Augusta Henriques (fl. 1991), conservationist

Honduras
Berta Cáceres (1971–2016), environmental activist and indigenous leader

Iceland
Sigríður Tómasdóttir (1871–1957), environmentalist active in saving the Gullfoss waterfalls from industrialization

India

Sulochana Gadgil (born 1944), meteorologist studying monsoons
Paramjit Khurana (born 1956), biologist specializing in plant biotechnology
Sunita Narain (born 1961), environmentalist, clean energy advocate and political activist
Medha Patkar (born 1964), politician, rights activist and environmentalist

Indonesia
Yuyun Ismawati (born 1964), environmental engineering involved in safe waste management involved in protecting reefs from plastic waste pollution
Mia Krisna Pratiwi (born 1996), environmental engineer
Swietenia Puspa Lestari (born 1994), environmental engineer

Ireland

Cara Augustenborg (born 1978), environmental scientist, also has US citizenship
Karin Dubsky (born 1954), German-born marine ecologist and environmental activist
Tara Shine, environmental scientist, policy advisor and science communicator

Italy
Simona Bordoni (born 1972), climatologist studying atmospheric dynamics in California
Nicola Scafetta (born 1975), astronomer and climate scientist

Kenya

Wangari Maathai (1940–2011), environmental activist, Nobel Peace Prize winner

Laos
Niane Sivongxay, zoologist specializing in zooplankton and amphibians

Madagascar
Marie Christina Kolo (born 1989), climate activist
Julie Hanta Razafimanahaka, conservation biologist

Marshall Islands
Kathy Jetn̄il-Kijiner, poet and climate change activist
Selina Leem, climate change activist and spoken word performer

Mexico
María Elena Caso (1915–1991), biologist pioneering the study if starfish and other echinoderms
Enriqueta Legorreta (1914–2010), two-time winner (2007 & 2019) of the Aguascalientes state prize for Environmental Merit
Enriqueta Medellín (1948–1922), winner of Mexico's highest Ecological award, the Premio al Mérito Ecológico in 2012

Netherlands
Elisabeth Gottschalk (1912–1989), investigated storm surges and river floods
Saskia Ozinga (born 1960), environmental and social activist involved in forest conservation

New Zealand

Rosemary Askin (born 1949), geologist, Antarctic researcher
Helen Plume, ministerial climate change expert
Gillian Wratt, (born 1954), botanist and Antarctic researcher

Niger
Mariama Mamane, environmentalist focusing on the ecology of rivers

Nigeria
Francisca Oboh Ikuenobe, geologist specializing in palynology and sedimentology
Eucharia Oluchi Nwaichi, environmental biochemist
Margaret Adebisi Sowunmi, botanist and environmental archaeologist

Norway
Ane Hansdatter Kismul (born 1980), politician and environmentalist
Ingrid Skjoldvær (born 1993), environmentalist active in the Nature and Youth organization
Gunhild Stordalen (born 1979), physician and environmental advocate, founder of a climate change foundation
Ragnhild Sundby (1922–2006), zoologist involved in environmental issues

Papua New Guinea
Mazzella Maniwavie (born 1987), mangrove conservationist and climate change activist

Peru

Liz Chicaje (born 1962), rain forest conservationist

Philippines
Joan Carling (born 1963), human rights activist and environmentalist
Gemma Narisma (1972–2021), climate scientist focusing on assessment

Poland
Zofia Kielan-Jaworowska (1925–2015), paleobiologist, expeditions to the Gobi Desert
Teresa Maryańska (1937–2019), paleontologist specializing in dinosaurs
Elwira Żmudzka, climatologist

Româniarights

Russia
Maria Klenova (1898–1976), pioneering Russian marine scientist
Olga Zolina (born 1975), climatologist, modeling of extreme precipitation

Rwanda
Rose Mukankomeje, politician and environmental activist addressing forest conservation

South Africa
Frances Gamble (1949–1997), climatologist and speleologist

South Korea
June-Yi Lee, atmospheric scientist investigating future climate scenarios

Spain
Paca Blanco (born 1949), environmentalist and women's rights activist
Aida Fernández Ríos (1947–2015), climate scientist and marine biologist

Sri Lanka
Michelle Dilhara (born 1996), actress and environmental activist
Sevvandi Jayakody, consersationist and echinodermologist

Sudan
Balgis Osman-Elasha, climate scientist studying climate change in Africa

Sweden

Isabelle Axelsson (born 2001), young climate activist
Inger Holmlund (1927–2019), environmentalist active in tree-planting and craft projects for women in Kenya
Greta Thunberg (born 2003), climate change activist beginning school climate strikes in 2018

Switzerland
Martine Rebetez (born 1961), climatologist working on the consequences of climate change in Switzerland
Sonja Wipf (born 1973), plant ecologist studying climate change
Anita Studer (born 1944), conservationist and ecologist

Thailand
Kotchakorn Voraakhom (born 1981), landscape architect contributing to projects addressing climate change

Trinidad and Tobago
Rahanna Alicia Juman (fl. 2000s), environmental researcher

United Kingdom

Helen ApSimon (born 1942), air pollution scientist
Sarah Martha Baker (1887–1917), botanist and ecologist
Brenda Boardman (born 1943), domestic energy efficiency and fuel poverty researcher and campaigner
Judith Bunbury (born 1967), geoarchaeologist
Tamsin Edwards, climate scientist, popular communicator
Hayley Fowler, research focused on climate change and variability on hydrological and water resource systems
Katharine Giles (1978–2013), climate scientist researching sea ice cover, ocean circulation and wind patterns
Jean Grove (1927-2001), glaciologist; the Little Ice Age
Joanna Haigh (1954-), atmospheric physicist, Co-Director of Grantham Institute at Imperial College London, solar variability
Gabriele C. Hegerl (born 1962), Professor of Climate System Science at the University of Edinburgh School of GeoSciences
Helene Hewitt, Met Office researcher on ocean modeling
Ellie Highwood, Professor of Climate Physics at the University of Reading
Joanne Johnson (born 1977), geologist, Antarctic scientist
Caroline King-Okumu, researcher focusing on dryland ecosystems, environmental assessment and climate change
Rachel Kyte, international strategist on sustainable energy
Sonya Legg, oceanographer studying ocean circulation processes
Diana Liverman (born 1954), climate impacts, vulnerability and policy
Georgina Mace (1953–2020), ecologist and conservation scientist
Barbara Maher (born 1960), environmental scientist researching magnetic particles and pollution
Stephanie Peay (born 1959), ecologist and crayfish researcher
Vicky Pope, Head of the Climate Prediction Programme at the Hadley Centre for Climate Prediction and Research
Paula Reimer, radiocarbon and archaeological scientist at the 14Chrono Centre for Climate
Emily Shuckburgh, climate scientist, mathematician and science communicator
Liz Thomas, paleoclimatologist, ice cores, British Antarctic Survey

United States

Lydia Adams-Williams (1867–1928), writer focusing on conservation and deforestation
Alice Alldredge, (born 1949) oceanographer and researcher of marine snow and demersal zooplankton
Tanya Atwater (born 1942), marine geologist
Thelma Babbitt (1906–2004), civil rights and environmental activist
Sallie Baliunas (born 1953), retired astrophysicist active in global warming and climate research
Lisa Beal, British-born oceanographer investigating the Agulhas current
Barbara Bell (1922–2017), astronomer contributing to climate history
Abigail Borah, environmental activist
Florence Elfelt Bramhall (1862–1924), forest conservationist
Emma Lucy Braun (1889–1971), botanist, ecologist and academic
Margaret Bryan Davis (born 1931), paleoecologist studying plant pollen
Molly Burhans (born 1989), cartographer and environmental activist
Elizabeth Canuel, chemical oceanographer investigating organic carbon cycling
Rachel Carson (1907–1964), marine biologist and conservationist
Jeannine Cavender-Bares (fl. 2000), evolutionary biologist
Danielle Claar, marine scientist studying effect of climate on coral symbionts and parasites
Amy C. Clement, atmospheric and marine scientist modelling climate change
Kim Cobb (born 1974), climate scientist studying oceanography
Lisa Goddard (1966–2022), climate scientist focused on weather forecasting
Emma Cole (1845–1910), botanist
Maureen Conte, biogeochemist studying long-term cycling of chemical compounds in seawater
Allison Crimmins, head of the National Climate Assessment
Heidi Cullen, meteorologist, chief scientist for Climate Central
Judith Curry, climatologist and former chair of the School of Earth and Atmospheric Sciences at the Georgia Institute of Technology
Rosanne D'Arrigo, climate researcher using dendrochronology
Kendra Daly, oceanographer specializing in zooplankton
Violet Dandridge (1878–1956), Smithsonian scientific illustrator
Lesley-Ann L. Dupigny-Giroux, Trinidad-born geographer and climate researcher, now in Vermont
Sylvia Earle (born 1935), marine biologist
Erika Edwards, researcher focusing on the evolution of plants
Eunice Newton Foote (1819–1888), scientist who discovered the effect of carbon dioxide on climate
Inez Fung, Hong Kong-born climate scientist, now in California
Pat Gozemba (born 1940), LGBT activist focusing on the environment
Jane Fonda (born 1937), actress, feminist and environmentalist
Grace Voss Frederick (1905–2009), actress later focusing on natural environmental preservation
Daphne Frias (born 1998), activist focusing on gun control, climate change and environmental and disability justice
Inez Fung (born 1949), climate modeling, biogeochemical cycles, and climate change
Niria Alicia Garcia (born 1993), environmental activist
Marika Holland, scientist working on sea ice modelling
Alice Clary Earle Hyde (1876–1943), botanical artist and conservationist
Deborah Jacobvitz, ecologist
Frances James (born 1930), ecologist and ornithologist
Gretchen Keppel-Aleks, climate scientist researching greenhouse gases
Caroline Ella Heminway Kierstead (1903–1985), geologist and micropaleontologist
Bronwen Konecky, climatologist focusing on climate change in the tropics
Winona LaDuke (born 1959), economist and environmentalist
Estella Leopold (born 1927), paleobotanist and conservationist
Beate G. Liepert, research scientist focusing on climate variability
Lorraine Lisiecki, paleoclimatologist studying the history of climate change
Hunter Lovins (born 1950), environmentalist and sustainable proponent
Jane Lubchenco (born 1947), environmentalist and marine biologist
Cherilla Storrs Lowrey (1861–1918), founder of The Outdoor Circle, Hawaii's oldest environmental organization
Kate Marvel, climate scientist, popular communicator
Galen McKinley, carbon cycle researcher, studying the interface between the ocean and the atmosphere
Marcia McNutt (born 1972), geophysicist, president of the National Academy of Sciences
Linda Mearns, geologist and climate scientist specializing in climate change assessment
Susanne Menden-Deuer (fl. 2000s), ecologist and oceanographer
Jill Mikucki, microbiologist, Antarctic researcher
Twila Moon, scientist researching the Greenland ice sheet
Marianne V. Moore, aquatic ecologist
Sue Moore, Arctic oceanographer studying whales
Ann Haven Morgan (1882–1966), zoologist and ecologist
Sam Mostyn (born c. 1964), businesswomen working on climate change
Margaret Mulholland, oceanographer studying nutrients in marine environments
Alison Murray, biochemist, Antarctic researcher
Margaret Nygard (1925–1995), British-born educator and conservationist
Karen Oberhauser (born 1956), conservation biologist working with monarch butterflies
Kittie Fenley Parker (1910–1994), botanical researcher and illustrator
Mary Peltola (fl. 1999), indigenous politician and environmentalist
Elsie Quarterman (1910–2014), plant ecologist
Marilyn Raphael, Trinidad-born climate change scientist working on polar research
Cicely Ridley (1927–2008), British-born mathematician focused on climate modelling
Edith A. Roberts (1881–1977), pioneering plant ecologist
Gabrielle Rocap (born 1971), marine biologist investigating marine bacteria and phytoplankton
Joan Roughgarden (born 1946), ecologist and evolutionary biologist
Cynthia E. Rosenzweig (born 1958), climatologist, pioneered the study of climate change and agriculture
Joellen Louise Russell (born 1970), oceanographer and climate scientist
Tatiana Rynearson, oceanographer studying plankton diversity
Eva Saulitis (1963–2016), marine biologist and writer
Sybil P. Seitzinger, oceanographer and climate scientist researching climate change and elemental cycling, especially nitrogen biogeochemistry
Susan Solomon (born 1956), research in chlorofluorocarbons and ozone depletion
Margaret Sordahl (1906–1995), ornithologist at the Smithsonian Astrophysucal Observatory
Lynne Talley, oceanographer and climate scientist at Scripps Institution of Oceanography
Elizabeth Teter Lunn (1904–1998), biologist and ecologist
Ellen Thomas (born 1950), Dutch-born environmental scientist specializing in marine micropaleontology and paleoceanography
Anne M. Thompson, specialist in atmospheric chemistry and climate change
LuAnne Thompson, oceanographer modeling movement of heat and chemical via ocean currents
Vivian Thomson (fl 1997), environmental policy academic
Maya Tolstoy, marine geophysicist investigating earthquakes in the deep sea
Susan Trumbore, earth systems scientist focusing on the carbon cycle and its effects on climate
Monica Turner (fl. 1980s), ecologist specializing in forest fires
Julienne Stroeve, polar climate scientist working on the remote sensing of ice and snow
Carol Van Strum (born 1940), environmentalist fighting against the use of pesticides
Betsy Weatherhead, former head of the National Climate Assessment
Rebecca Woodgate, oceanographer working on ocean circulation in polar regions
Kakani Katija Young, bioengineer focusing on marine organisms
Linda Zall, environmental scientist specializing in satellite data
Joy Zedler (born 1943), restoration and wetland ecologist

Uganda

Vanessa Nakate (born 1996), climate justice activist

Uruguay
Lucrecia Covelo (1920–2000), entomologist and conservationish

Vanuatu
Litiana Kalsrap (born 1992), climate activist

Vietnam
Hoang Thi Than, geological engineer and archaeologist

References

See also 
List of climate scientists
Women in climate change

Women

Climatologists
Lists of women scientists